Hot Country Songs is a chart that ranks the top-performing country music songs in the United States, published by Billboard magazine.  In 2000, 19 different songs topped the chart, then published under the title Hot Country Singles & Tracks, in 52 issues of the magazine, based on weekly airplay data from country music radio stations compiled by Nielsen Broadcast Data Systems.

Singer Faith Hill's song "Breathe" was at number one at the start of the year, having risen to the top in the issue dated December 25, 1999.  The song remained at number one for six consecutive weeks until it was knocked off by "Cowboy Take Me Away", performed by the girl group the Dixie Chicks, in the issue dated February 5.  "Breathe" was also named the most successful single of the year on the magazine's main singles chart, the Hot 100.  Hill returned to the top of the country charts with her next single, "The Way You Love Me", which spent four weeks at number one in May and June.  Only two other acts, Lonestar and Hill's husband Tim McGraw, had more than one Hot Country Songs number one during the year.  Other singles with extended runs at number one include "How Do You Like Me Now?!" by Toby Keith, "I Hope You Dance" by Lee Ann Womack featuring Sons of the Desert and "That's the Way" by Jo Dee Messina, each of which topped the chart for five weeks.  "How Do You Like Me Now?!" was ranked number one on Billboard's year-end chart of the most popular country songs.

In 2000, Chad Brock and Phil Vassar achieved their first Hot Country Songs number ones with "Yes!" and "Just Another Day in Paradise" respectively.  Veteran singer Kenny Rogers gained his first number one in thirteen years when "Buy Me a Rose", featuring Billy Dean and Alison Krauss, topped the chart in May.  At age 61 Rogers became the oldest artist to achieve a number one country hit.  The final number one hit of the year was McGraw's "My Next Thirty Years".

Chart history

See also
2000 in music
List of artists who reached number one on the U.S. country chart

References

2000
2000 record charts
2000 in American music